The 2001 Dutch Figure Skating Championships took place between 4 and 6 January 2001 in Eindhoven. Skaters competed in the disciplines of men's singles, ladies' singles, and ice dancing.

Senior results

Men

Ladies

Ice dancing

External links
 results

Dutch Figure Skating Championships
Dutch Figure Skating Championships, 2001
2001 in Dutch sport